Jason van Duiven (born 24 February 2005) is a Dutch professional footballer who plays for Jong PSV.

Club career 
Jason van Duiven grew up in Almelo, Overijssel, where he first started playing football in local amateur clubs, before joining FC Twente, along with his younger brother Robin.

In 2018, the two van Duiven brothers joined the PSV Eindhoven academy. There, Jason quickly impressed with his goal-scoring abilities in the youth teams, signing his first professional contract with PSV in 2020, whilst aged only 15.

After a standout 2021–22 season with the under-17s, as he scored 21 goals and delivered 9 assists in 17 games, van Duiven made his professional debut for Jong PSV on the 5 August 2022, starting as a centre-forward during a 1–1 away Eerste Divisie draw against Willem II.

International career 
A youth international for the Netherlands, Jason van Duiven was a standout player of the Netherlands under-17 team that reached the final of the 2022 European Under-17 Championship: already a goalscorer in the pool stage, he scored decisive goals to knock out Italy in the quarter-finals and Serbia in the semi-finals, before his team was eventually defeated by France in the final.

Honours 
Netherlands under-17

 UEFA European Under-17 Championship: finalist in 2022.

References

External links

2005 births
Living people
Dutch footballers
Netherlands youth international footballers
Association football forwards
Sportspeople from Almelo
Jong PSV players
Eerste Divisie players
Footballers from Overijssel
FC Twente players
PSV Eindhoven players